Ayna is a monotypic genus of air-breathing land snails.

Ayna may also refer to:
 Aýna, Albacete, a town in Castile-La Mancha, Spain
 Ayna District, a district of La Mar, Peru
 Ayna (band), a Turkish rock band
 Ayna TV, a former television station in Afghanistan
 Ayna, a character in Power of Three
 Ayna, a newspaper in Azerbaijan

People with the surname
 Emine Ayna (born 1968), politician in Turkey of Zaza descent

See also
Aina (disambiguation)
Anya (disambiguation)